= Omsk Popov Production Association =

- Founded: 1954
- Headquarters: Omsk, Russia
- Parent: Interstate Development Corporation
- Website: relero.ru

Omsk Popov Production Association (Russian: Омское производственное объединение «Радиозавод им. А. С. Попова») is a company based in Omsk, Russia. It is part of the Belarus-based Interstate Development Corporation.

The Omsk Popov Radio Plant is an important Russian developer of advanced communications systems, including mobile systems, for military and civil use. Production includes the "Malyutka" and "Azid" families of radio relay and radiotelephone stations for setting up local telephone communication lines and for local communications in the areas of transport, power systems, petroleum, gas pipelines, etc. The Omsk Popov Radio Plant also produces telescopic antenna masts.
